Mozaffarabad may refer to:

Fars Province
 Mozaffarabad, Kazerun, Fars Province
 Mozaffarabad, Khorrambid, Fars Province

Hormozgan Province
 Mozaffarabad, Hormozgan

Isfahan Province
 Mozaffarabad, Isfahan, a village in Nain County

Kerman Province
 Mozaffarabad, Kerman
 Mozaffarabad, Rudbar-e Jonubi, Kerman Province

Kohgiluyeh and Boyer-Ahmad Province
 Mozaffarabad, Kohgiluyeh and Boyer-Ahmad, a village in Gachsaran County

Kurdistan Province
 Mozaffarabad, Kurdistan, a village in Qorveh County

Markazi Province

Razavi Khorasan Province
 Mozaffarabad, Bardaskan, Razavi Khorasan Province
 Mozaffarabad, Nishapur, Razavi Khorasan Province
 Mozaffarabad, Sabzevar, Razavi Khorasan Province

West Azerbaijan Province
 Mozaffarabad, Khoy, West Azerbaijan Province
 Mozaffarabad, Miandoab, West Azerbaijan Province

See also
 Muzaffarabad (disambiguation), places in Pakistan